The majority of the colleges in Srinagar are affiliated to the University of Kashmir and are spread throughout the city. Students from different parts of the valley study in these colleges. At the undergraduate level, Bachelor of Arts, Bachelor of Science, and Bachelor of Commerce are the most common courses in these colleges. Along with these conventional courses, many colleges also offer professional courses which concentrate on a specialized field an example of that is National Institute of Technology, Srinagar.

Colleges in Srinagar
The following list of the colleges in Srinagar.

Degree colleges and B.Ed colleges 
 Amar Singh College, Srinagar
 Birla Post Graduate College, Srinagar
 Dr Iqbal Teacher Training College of Education, Srinagar
 Gandhi Memorial College, Srinagar
 Government College for Women, M.A. Road Srinagar
 Govt. Women College, Nawakadal, Srinagar
 Government College of Education, Srinagar
 Government Degree College,Bemina
 Government Degree College of Handware, Srinagar
 Govt Degree College, Bagi Dilawar Khan, Srinagar
 Islamia College of Science and Commerce, Srinagar
 Jamiya-Tul-Banat, Srinagar
 Kamla Nehru Memorial, Maqhavidyala, Srinagar
 MA College of Education, Srinagar
 Qumariya College of Education (QCE), Srinagar
 Ramzan College of Education, Srinagar
 Rizwan Memorial Womens College of Education (RMCE), Srinagar
 Shadab College of Education, Srinagar
 Shanti Niketan College of Education (SNCE), Srinagar
 SM Iqbal College ofducation (SMICE) Rangreth, Srinagar
 SP memorial B.Ed college, Srinagar
 Sri Pratap College, Srinagar
 Vishwa Bharti Womens College, Rainawari Srinagar
 Nund Reshi College of Education(NRC)-Natipora

Medical colleges
 Bibi Haleema Nursing College, Srinagar
 Government Dental College, Srinagar
 Government Medical College, Srinagar
 Sher-i-Kashmir Instt. of Medical Sciences, Soura, Srinagar
 Kashmir Institute of Medical Sciences and Technology, Lawaypora, Srinagar(www.kashmirinstitute.com)

Engineering colleges
National Institute of Technology, Srinagar
SSM College of Engineering

Design College
National Institute of Fashion Technology, Srinagar

Hotel Management
Institute of Hotel Management, Srinagar

Polytechnic colleges
 Government Polytechnic for Women, Bemina, Srinagar
 Kashmir Government Polytechnic, Srinagar
 Kite Polytechnic, Srinagar
 Royal Polytechnic College, Srinagar

Law colleges
 College of Forestry — Srinagar
 Kashmir Law College Nowshera, Srinagar
 Vitasta School of Law and Humanities, Srinagar

Technical training
IT Concepts, Srinagar
Institute of Music and Fine Arts, Srinagar
Industrial Training Institute (ITI), Srinagar

Technology and Management
Iqbal Institute of Technology and Management, Srinagar
SM Iqbal Business School SMIBS, Srinagar
CASET College of Computer Science, Srinagar
 DOEACC, Rangreth Srinagar
 Masterpro Institute of Technology, Srinagar

See also
List of colleges affiliated to Kashmir University, Kashmir
Caset College of Computer Science
List of engineering colleges in Jammu and Kashmir
SSM College of Engineering, Kashmir
NIT Srinagar

References

Universities and colleges
Srinagar
Srinagar
colleges in Srinagar